Howard Cyrus Lawrence (August 14, 1890 – May 20, 1961) was an American politician from the U.S. state of Michigan.

Biography 
Lawrence was born in Sebewa Township, Michigan in Ionia County, the son of Cyrus S. Lawrence and Margaret (Neidhardt) Lawrence.  He resided in Ionia, Saginaw and Grand Rapids.  Lawrence married Clara Louise Luther on May 1, 1913.

Lawrence was a banker and a business partner and executive secretary to Governor of Michigan, Fred W. Green.  He was Chairman of the Michigan Republican Party from 1929 to 1937.  He also served as State Treasurer of Michigan, 1931–32 and was defeated in 1932 for re-election.  He was a delegate (alternate) from Michigan to the 1936 Republican National Convention which nominated Alf Landon for U.S. President, and the 1940 convention which nominated Wendell Willkie, both of whom lost to Franklin D. Roosevelt.

He was a Protestant and a member of the Freemasons, Elks and Rotary.

References 

 The Political Graveyard

1890 births
1961 deaths
American Freemasons
American Protestants
Michigan Republican Party chairs
Michigan Republicans
State treasurers of Michigan
People from Ionia County, Michigan